A list of films released in Japan in 1991 (see 1991 in film).

See also 
 1991 in Japan
 1991 in Japanese television

Footnotes

References

External links
 Japanese films of 1991 at the Internet Movie Database

1991
Lists of 1991 films by country or language
Fil